Selenium oxybromide (SeOBr2) is a selenium oxohalide chemical compound.

Preparation
Selenium oxybromide can be prepared through the reaction of selenium dioxide and selenium tetrabromide. Selenium and selenium dioxide are reacted with bromine to form selenium monobromide and selenium tetrabromide. Dissolving the selenium dioxide in the tetrabromide will produce the oxybromide.
2 Se + Br2 → Se2Br2
Se2Br2 + 3 Br2 → 2 SeBr4
SeBr4 + SeO2 → 2 SeOBr2

Structure
Evidence from infrared and polarized Raman spectroscopy suggests that selenium oxybromide adopts a pyramidal molecular geometry with Cs symmetry, like other chalcogen(IV) oxohalides such as thionyl bromide and selenium oxydichloride.

Properties
Selenium oxybromide is a reddish-brown solid with a low melting point (41.6 °C) and chemical properties similar to selenium oxychloride. It boils at 220 °C and decomposes near the boiling point, making distillation an ineffective purification method. Its electrical conductivity in the liquid state just above the melting temperature is 6×10−5 S/m. SeOBr2 is hydrolyzed by water to form H2SeO3 and HBr.

SeOBr2 is highly reactive, with most reactions taking place in the liquid state. Selenium will dissolve in it, forming Se2Br2. Iron, copper, gold, platinum, and zinc are all attacked by SeOBr2.

References

Selenium(IV) compounds
Oxobromides